Alexander Straus (born 20 October 1975) is a Norwegian football coach. He has been the head coach of FC Bayern München's women's team since July 2022.

He started his coaching career in Varegg. He was an active player in the same club. 

Straus was wanted as assistent coach for Nest-Sotra in 2013. The club had at the time David Nielsen as head coach. And Straus accepted the job. The two coaches lead the club in their promotion to First Division from Second Division. After that, Nielsen was wanted as Ronny Deila's assistant in Strømsgodset, so Straus became the head coach for Nest-Sotra in their first season in First Division.

In 2014, David Nielsen became the head coach for Strømsgodset. And again, Straus was wanted as assitant coach. Straus accepted the job. In total, he worked for the club for 3.5 year, first as assistant coach, then as head of youth development. 

In 2018, Straus became the head coach for Sandviken in Toppserien. With Straus as coach, the team came to their first cup finale since 1995 and came fourth in the league.

The autumn 2018, Straus was hired as head coach for Norway women's national under-23 team. From the Summer of 2019, he also became the coach for Norway national under-19 team.

In September 2020 it became official that Straus again was going to be the head coach for Sandviken. In 2021, the club won Toppserien for the first time, in addition to reaching the cup finale. Before the 2022 season, it was decided that  Sandviken should be a part of SK Brann, and Straus, therefore, was Brann Kvinner's first head coach.

In June 2022, it became official that Straus was the new head coach for Bayern München.

References 

Norwegian football managers
Norwegian expatriate football managers
1975 births

Living people